Warrior Mountain Wildlife Management Area is a Wildlife Management Area in Oldtown, Allegany County, Maryland.

External links
 Warrior Mountain Wildlife Management Area

Wildlife management areas of Maryland
Protected areas of Allegany County, Maryland